

Introduction 

DEPARTMENT OF JUSTICE WHITE PAPER

Lawfulness of a Lethal Operation Directed Against a U.S. Citizen Who Is a Senior Operational Leader of Al-Qa'ida or An Associated Force

This white paper sets forth a legal framework for considering the circumstances in which the U.S. government could use lethal force in a foreign country outside the area of active hostilities against a U.S. citizen who is a senior operational leader of al-Qa'ida or an associated force of al-Qa'ida—that is, an al-Qa'ida leader actively engaged in planning operations to kill Americans. The paper does not attempt to determine the minimum requirements necessary to render such an operation lawful; nor does it assess what might be required to render a lethal operation against a U.S. citizen lawful in other circumstances, including an operation against enemy forces on a traditional battlefield or an operation against a U.S. citizen who is not a senior operational leader of such forces. Here the Department of Justice concludes only that where the following three conditions are met, a U.S. operation using lethal force in a foreign country against a U.S. citizen who is a senior operational leader of al-Qa'ida or an associated force would be lawful: (1) an informed; high-level official of the U.S. government has determined that the targeted individual poses an imminent threat of violent attack against the United States; (2) capture is infeasible, and the United States continues to monitor whether capture becomes feasible; and (3) the operation would be conducted in a manner consistent with applicable law of war principles. This conclusion is reached with recognition of the extraordinary seriousness of a lethal operation by the United States against a U.S. citizen, and also of the extraordinary seriousness of the threat posed by senior operational al-Qa'ida members and the loss of life that would result were their operations successful.

The President has authority to respond to the imminent threat posed by al-Qa'ida and its associated forces, arising from his constitutional responsibility to protect the country, the inherent right of the United States to national self-defense under international law, Congress's authorization of the use of all necessary and appropriate military force against this enemy, and the existence of an armed conflict with al-Qa'ida under international law. Based on these authorities, the President may use force against al-Qa'ida and its associated forces. As detailed in this white paper, in defined circumstances, targeted killing of a U.S. citizen who has joined al-Qa'ida or its associated forces would be lawful under U.S. and international law. Targeting a member of an enemy force who poses an imminent threat of violent attack to the United States is not unlawful. It is a lawful act of national self-defense. Nor would it violate otherwise applicable federal laws barring unlawful killings in Title 18 or the assassination ban in Executive Order No 12333. Moreover, a lethal operation in a foreign nation would be consistent with international legal principles of sovereignty and neutrality if it were conducted, for example, with the consent of the host nation's government or after a determination that the host nation is unable or unwilling to suppress the threat posed by the individual targeted.

Were the target of a lethal operation a U.S. citizen who may have rights under the Due Process Clause and the Fourth Amendment, that individual's citizenship would not immunize him from a lethal operation. Under the traditional due process balancing analysis of Mathews v. Eldridge, we recognize that there is no private interest more weighty than a person's interest in his life. But that interest must be balanced against the United States' interest in forestalling the threat of violence and death to other Americans that arises from an individual who is a senior operational leader of al-Q'aida or an associated force of al-Q'aida and who is engaged in plotting against the United States.

The paper begins with a summary of the authority for the use of force in the situation described here, including the authority to target a U.S. citizen having the characteristics described above with lethal force outside the area of active hostilities. It continues with the constitutional questions, considering first whether a lethal operation against such a U.S. citizen would be consistent with the Fifth Amendment's Due Process Clause, U.S. Const, amend. V. As part of the due process analysis, the paper explains the concepts of "imminence," feasibility of capture, and compliance with applicable law of war principles. The paper then discusses whether such an operation would be consistent with the Fourth Amendment's prohibition on unreasonable seizures, U.S. Const, amend. IV; It concludes that where certain conditions are met, a lethal operation against a U.S. citizen who is a senior operational leader of al-Qa'ida or its associated forces—a terrorist organization engaged in constant plotting against the United States, as well as an enemy force with which the United States is in a congressionally authorized armed conflict—and who himself poses an imminent threat of violent attack against the United States, would not violate the Constitution. The paper also includes an analysis concluding that such an operation would not violate certain criminal provisions prohibiting the killing of U.S. nationals outside the United States; nor would it constitute either the commission of a war crime or an assassination prohibited by Executive Order 12333.

I. 

The United States is in an armed conflict with al-Qa'ida and its associated forces, and Congress has authorized the President to use all necessary and appropriate force against those entities. See Authorization for Use of Military Force ("AUMF"), Pub. L. No. 107-40, § 2(a), 115 Stat. 224, 224 (2001). In addition to the authority arising from the AUMF, the President's use of force against al-Qa'ida and associated forces is lawful under other principles of U.S. and international law, including the President's constitutional responsibility to protect the nation and the inherent right to national self-defense recognized in international law (see, e.g., U.N. Charter art. 51). It was on these bases that the United States responded to the attacks of September 11, 2001, and "[t]hese domestic and international legal authorities continue to this day." Harold Hongju Koh, Legal Adviser, U.S. Department of State, Address to the Annual Meeting of the American Society of International Law: The Obama Administration and International Law (Mar. 25,2010) (" Koh ASIL Speech]").

Any operation of the sort discussed here would be conducted in a foreign country against a senior operational leader of al-Qa'ida or its associated forces who poses an imminent threat of violent attack against the United States. The use of force under such circumstances would be justified as an act of national self-defense. Also, such a person would be within the core of individuals against whom Congress has authorized the use of necessary and appropriate force. The fact that such a person would also be a U.S. citizen would not alter this conclusion. The Supreme Court has held that the military may constitutionally use force against a U.S. citizen who is a part of enemy forces. See Hamdi, 542 U.S. 507, 518 (2004) (plurality opinion); id. at 587, 597 (Thomas, J., dissenting); Ex Parte Quirin, 317 U.S. at 37-38. Like the imposition of military detention, the use of lethal force against such enemy forces is an "important incident of war." Hamdi, 542 U.S. at 518 (plurality opinion) (quotation omitted). See, e.g., General Orders No. 100: Instructions for the Government of Armies of the United States in the Field ¶ 15 (Apr. 24, 1863) ("[military necessity admits of all direct destruction of life or limb of armed enemies") (emphasis omitted); International Committee of the Red Cross, Commentary on the Additional Protocols of 8 June 1977 to the Geneva Conventions of 12 Aug. 1949 and Relating to the Protection of Victims of Non-International Armed Conflicts (Additional Protocol II) § 4789 (1987) ("Those who belong to armed forces or armed groups may be attacked at any time."); Yoram Dinstein, The Conduct of Hostilities Under the Law of International Armed Conflict  94 (2004) ("When a person takes up arms or merely dons a uniform as a member of the armed forces, he automatically exposes himself to enemy attack."). Accordingly, the Department does not believe that U.S. citizenship would immunize a senior operational leader of al-Qa'ida or its associated forces from a use of force abroad authorized by the AUMF or in national self-defense.

In addition, the United States retains its authority to use force against al-Qa'ida and associated forces outside the area of active hostilities when it targets a senior operational leader of the enemy forces who are actively engaged in planning operations to kill Americans. The United States is currently in a non-international armed conflict with al-Qa'ida and its associated forces. See Hamdan v. Rumsfeld, 548 U.S. 557, 628-31 (2006) (holding that a conflict between a nation and a transnational non-state actor, occurring outside the nation's territory, is an armed conflict "not of an international character" (quoting Common Article 3 of the Geneva Conventions) because it is not a "clash between nations"). Any U.S. operation would be part of this non-international armed conflict, even if it were to take place away from the zone of active hostilities. See John O. Brennan, Assistant to the President for Homeland Security and Counterterrorism, Remarks at the Program on Law and Security, Harvard Law School: Strengthening Our Security by Adhering to Our Values and Laws (September. 16, 2011) ("The United States does not view our authority to use military force against al-Qa'ida as being restricted solely to 'hot' battlefields like Afghanistan."). For example, the AUMF itself does not set forth an express geographic limitation on the use of force it authorizes. See Hamdan, 548 U.S. at 631 (Kennedy, J., concurring) (what makes a non-international armed conflict distinct from an international armed conflict is "the legal status of the entities opposing each other").  None of the three branches of the U.S. Government has identified a strict geographical limit on the permissible scope of the AUMF's authorization. See, e.g., Letter for the Speaker of the House of Representatives and the President Pro Tempore of the Senate from the President (June 15, 2010) (reporting that the armed forces, with the assistance of numerous international partners, continue to conduct operations "against al-Qa'ida terrorists," and that the United States has "deployed combat-equipped forces to a number of locations in the U.S. Central... Command area[] of operation in support of those [overseas counter-terrorist] operations"); Bensayah v. Obama, 610 F.3d 718, 720, 724-25, 727 (D.C. Cir. 2010) (concluding that an individual turned over to the United States in Bosnia could be detained if the government demonstrates he was part of al-Qa'ida); al-Adahi v. Obama, 613 F.3d 1102,1003,11U (D.C. Cir. 2010) (noting authority under AUMF to detain individual apprehended by Pakistani authorities in Pakistan and then transferred to U.S. custody)

Claiming that for purposes of international law, an armed conflict generally exists only when there is "protracted armed violence between governmental authorities and organized armed groups," Prosecutor v. Tadic, Case No. IT-94-1AR72, Decision on the Defence Motion for Interlocutory Appeal on Jurisdiction, 70 (Int'l Crim. Trib. for the Former Yugoslavia, App. Chamber Oct. 2,1995), some commenters have suggested that the conflict between the United States and al-Qa'ida cannot lawfully extend to nations outside Afghanistan in which the level of hostilities is less intense or prolonged than in Afghanistan itself. See e.g., Mary Ellen O'Connell, Combatants and the Combat Zone, 43 U. Rich. L. Rev. 845,857-59 (2009). There is little judicial or other authoritative precedents that speaks directly to the question of the geographic scope of a non-international armed conflict in which one of the parties is a transnational, non-state actor and where the principal theater of operations is not within the territory of the nation that is a party to the conflict. Thus, in considering this potential issue, the Department looks to principles and statements from analogous contexts.

The Department has not found any authority for the proposition that when one of the parties to an armed conflict plans and executes operations from a base in a new nation, an operation to engage the enemy in that location cannot be part of the original armed conflict, and thus subject to the laws of war governing that conflict unless the hostilities become sufficiently intense and protracted in the new location. That does not appear to be the rule of the historical practice, for instance, even in a traditional international conflict. See John R. Stevenson, Legal Adviser, Department of State, United States Military Action in Cambodia: Questions of International Law, Address before the Hammarskjold Forum of the Association of the Bar of the City of New York (May 28, 1970), in 3 The Vietnam War and International Law: The Widening Context 23,28-30 (Richard A. Falk, ed. 1972) (arguing that in an international armed conflict, if a neutral state has been unable for any reason to prevent violations of its neutrality by the troops of one belligerent Using its territory as a base of operations, the other belligerent has historically been justified in attacking those enemy forces in that state). Particularly in a non-international armed conflict, where terrorist organizations may move their base of operations from one country to another, the determination of whether a particular operation would be part of an ongoing armed conflict would require consideration of the particular facts and circumstances in each case, including the fact that transnational non-state organizations such as al-Qa'ida may have no single site serving as their base of operations. See also, e.g., Geoffrey S. Corn & Eric Talbot Jensen, Untying the Gordian Knot: A Proposal for Determining Applicability of the Laws of War to the War on Terror, 81 Temp. L. Rev. 787, 799 (2008) ("If... the ultimate purpose of the drafters of the Geneva Conventions was to prevent 'law avoidance' by developing de facto law triggers—a purpose consistent with the humanitarian foundation of the treaties—then the myopic focus on the geographic nature of armed conflict in the context of transnational counterterrorism combat operations serves to frustrate that purpose.").

If an operation of the kind discussed in this paper were to occur in a location where al-Qa'ida or an associated force has a significant and organized presence and from which al-Qa'ida or an associated force, including its senior operational leaders, plan attacks against U.S. persons and interests, the operation would be part of the non-international armed conflict between the United States and al-Qa'ida that the Supreme Court recognized in Hamdan. Moreover, such an operation would be consistent with international legal principles of sovereignty and neutrality if it were conducted, for example, with the consent of the host nation's government or after a determination that the host nation is unable or unwilling to suppress the threat posed by the individual targeted. In such circumstances, targeting a U.S. citizen of the kind described in this paper would be authorized under the AUMF and the inherent right to national self-defense. Given this authority, the question becomes whether and what further restrictions may limit its"exercise.

II. 

The Department assumes that the rights afforded by the Fifth Amendment's Due Process Clause, as well as the Fourth Amendment, attach to a U.S. citizen even while he is abroad. See Reid v. Covert, 354 U.S. 1, 5-6 (1957) (plurality opinion); United States v. Verdugo-Urquidez, 494 U.S. 259,269-70 (1990); see also In re Terrorist Bombings of U.S. Embassies in East Africa, 552 F.3d 157, 170 n.7 (2d-Cir. 2008). The U.S. citizenship of a leader of al-Qa'ida or its associated forces, however, does not give that person constitutional immunity from attack. This paper next considers whether and in what circumstances a lethal operation would violate any possible constitutional protections of a U.S. citizen.

A. 

The Due Process Clause would not prohibit a lethal operation of the sort contemplated here. In Hamdi, a plurality of the Supreme Court used the Mathews v. Eldridge balancing test to analyze the Fifth Amendment due process rights of a U.S. citizen who had been captured on the battlefield in Afghanistan and detained in the United States, and who wished to challenge the government's assertion that he was part of enemy forces. The Court explained that the "process due in any given instance is determined by weighing 'the private interest that will be affected by the official action' against the Government's asserted interest, 'including the function involved' and the burdens the Government would face in providing greater process." Hamdi, 542 U.S. at 529 (plurality opinion) (quoting Mathews v. Eldridge, 424 U.S. 319,335 (1976)). The due process balancing analysis applied to determine the Fifth Amendment rights of a U.S. citizen concerning law-of-war detention supplies the framework for assessing the process due a U.S. citizen who is a senior operational leader of an enemy force planning violent attacks against Americans before he is subjected to lethal targeting.

In the circumstances considered here, the interests on both sides would be weighty. See Hamdi, 542 U.S. at 529 (plurality opinion) ("It is beyond question that substantial interests lie on both sides of the scale in this case."). An individual's interest in avoiding erroneous deprivation of his life is "uniquely compelling." See Ake v. Oklahoma, 470 U.S. 68, 178 (1985) ("The private interest in the accuracy of a criminal proceeding that places an individual's life or liberty at risk is almost uniquely compelling."). No private interest is more substantial. At the same time, the government's interest in waging war, protecting its citizens, and removing the threat posed by members of enemy forces is also compelling. Cf. Hamdi, 542 U.S. at 531 (plurality opinion) ("On the other side of the scale are the weighty and sensitive governmental interests in ensuring that those who have fought with the enemy during a war do not return to battle against the United States."). As the Hamdi plurality observed, in the "circumstances of war," "the risk of erroneous deprivation of a citizen's liberty in the absence of sufficient process ... is very real," id. at 530 (plurality opinion), and, of course, the risk of erroneous deprivation of a citizen's life is even more significant. But, "the realities of combat" render certain uses of force "necessary and appropriate," including force against U.S. citizens who have joined enemy forces in the armed conflict against the US and whose activities pose an imminent threat of violent attack against the United States - and "due process analysis need not blink at those realities." Id. at 531 (plurality opinion). These same realities must also be considered in assessing "the burdens the Government would face in providing greater process" to a member of enemy forces. Id. at 529, 531 (plurality opinion).

Given these interests and practical considerations, the United States would be able to use lethal force against a U.S. citizen, who is located outside the United States and is an operational leader continually planning attacks against U.S. persons and interests, in at least the following circumstances: (1) where an informed, high-level official of the. U.S. government has determined that the targeted individual poses an imminent threat of violent attack against the United States; (2) where a capture operation would be infeasible—and where those conducting the operation continue to monitor whether capture becomes feasible; and (3) where such an operation would be conducted consistent with applicable law of war principles. In these circumstances, the "realities" of the conflict and the weight of the government's interest in protecting its citizens from an imminent attack are such that the Constitution would not require the government to provide further process to such a U.S. citizen before using lethal force. Cf. Hamdi, 542 U.S. at 535 (plurality opinion) (noting that the Court "accord[s] the greatest respect and consideration to the judgments of military authorities in matters relating to the actual prosecution of war, and... the scope of that discretion necessarily is wide"); id. at 534 (plurality opinion) ("The parties agree that initial captures on the battlefield need not receive the process we have discussed here; that process is due only when the determination is made to continue to hold those who have been seized.") (emphasis omitted).

Certain aspects of this legal framework require additional explication. First, the condition that an operational leader presents an "imminent" threat of violent attack against the United States does not require the United States to have clear evidence that a specific attack on U.S. persons and interests will take place in the immediate future. Given the nature of, for example, the terrorist attacks on September 11, in which civilian airliners were hijacked to strike the World Trade Center and the Pentagon, this definition of imminence, which would require the United States to refrain from action until preparations for an attack are concluded, would not allow the United States sufficient time to defend itself. The defensive options available to the United States may be reduced or eliminated if al-Qa'ida operatives disappear and cannot be found when the time of their attack approaches. Consequently, concerning al-Qa'ida leaders who are continually planning attacks, the United States is likely to have only a limited window of opportunity within which to defend Americans in a manner that has both a high likelihood of success and sufficiently reduces the probabilities of civilian casualties. See Michael N. Schmitt, State-Sponsored Assassination in International and Domestic Law, 17. Yale J. Int'l L. 609, 648 (1992). Furthermore, a "terrorist 'war' does not consist of a massive attack across an international border, nor does it consist of one isolated incident that occurs and is then past. It is the drawn-out patient, sporadic pattern of attacks. It is very difficult to know when or where the next incident will occur." Gregory M. Travalio, Terrorism, International Law, and the Use of Military Force, 18 Wis. Int'l L.J. 145, 173 (2000); see also Testimony of Attorney-General Lord Goldsmith, 660 Hansard. H.L. (April 21, 2004) 370 (U.K.), available at publications.parliament.uk (what constitutes an imminent threat "will develop to meet new circumstances and new threats .... It must be right that states can act in self-defense in circumstances where there is evidence of further imminent attacks by terrorist groups, even if there is no specific evidence of where such an attack will take place or of the precise nature of the attack."). Delaying action against individuals continually planning to kill Americans until some theoretical end-stage of the planning for a particular plot would create an unacceptably high risk that the action would fail and that American casualties would result.

By its nature, therefore, the threat posed by al-Qa'ida and its associated forces demands a broader concept of imminence in judging when a person continually planning terror attacks presents an imminent threat, making the use of force appropriate. In this context, imminence must incorporate considerations of the relevant window of opportunity, the possibility of reducing collateral damage to civilians, and the likelihood of heading off future disastrous attacks on Americans. Thus, a decision-maker determining whether an al-Qa'ida operational leader presents an imminent threat of violent attack against the United States must take into account that certain members of al-Qa'ida (including any potential target of lethal force) are continually plotting attacks against the United States; that al-Qa'ida would engage in such attacks regularly to the extent it were able to do so; that the U.S. government may not be aware of all al-Qa'ida plots as they are developing and thus cannot be confident that none is about to occur; and that, in light of these predicates, the nation may have a limited window of opportunity within which to strike in a manner that both has a high likelihood of success and reduces the probability of American casualties.

With this understanding, a high-level official could conclude, for example, that an individual poses an"imminent threat of violent attack against the United States where he is an operational leader of al-Qa'ida or an associated force and is personally and continually involved in planning terrorist attacks against the United States. Moreover, where the al-Qa'ida member in question has recently been involved in activities posing an imminent threat of violent attack against the United States, and there is no evidence suggesting that he has renounced or abandoned such activities, that member's involvement in al-Qa'ida's continuing terrorist campaign against the United States would. support the conclusion that the member poses an imminent threat.

Second, regarding the feasibility of capture, capture would not be feasible if it could not be physically effectuated during the relevant window of opportunity or if the relevant country were to decline to consent to a capture operation. Other factors such as undue risk to U.S. personnel conducting a potential capture operation also could be relevant. Feasibility would be a highly fact-specific and potentially time-sensitive inquiry.

Third, it is a premise here that any such lethal operation by the United States would comply with the four fundamental law-of-war principles governing the use of force: necessity, distinction, proportionality, and humanity (the avoidance of unnecessary suffering). See, e.g., United States Air Force, Targeting, Air Force Doctrine Document 2-1.9, at 88 (June 8, 2006); Dinstein, Conduct of Hostilities at 16-20, 115-16, 119-23; see also 2010 Koh ASIL Speech. For example, it would not be consistent with those principles to continue an operation if anticipated civilian casualties would be excessive in relation to the anticipated military advantage. Chairman of the Joint Chiefs of Staff Instruction 5810.01D, Implementation of the DoD Law of War Program ^ 4.a, at 1 (Apr. 30,2010). An operation consistent with the laws of war could not violate the prohibitions against treachery and perfidy, which address a breach of confidence by the assailant. See, e.g., Hague Convention IV, Annex, art. 23(b), Oct. 18, 1907, 36 stat 2277,2301-02 ("[I]t is especially forbidden ... [t]o kill or wound treacherously individuals belonging to the hostile nation or army ...."). These prohibitions do not, however, categorically forbid the use of stealth or surprise, nor forbid attacks on identified individual soldiers or officers. See U.S. Army Field Manual 27-10, The Law of Land Warfare, ¶ 31 (1956) (article 23(b) of the Annex to the Hague Convention IV does not "preclude attacks on individual soldiers or officers of the enemy whether in the zone of hostilities, occupied territory, or else-where"). And the Department is not aware of any other law-of-war grounds precluding use of such tactics. See Dinstein, Conduct of Hostilities at 94-95, 199;  Abraham D. Sofaer, Terrorism, the Law, and the National Defense, 126 Mil. L. Rev. 89, 120-21 (1989). Relatedly, "there is no prohibition under the laws of war on the use of technologically advanced weapons systems in armed conflict—such as pilotless aircraft or so-called smart bombs—as long as they are employed in conformity with applicable laws of war." 2010 Koh ASIL Speech. Further, under this framework, the United States would also be required to accept a surrender if it were feasible to do so.

In sum, an operation in the circumstances and under the constraints described above would not result in a violation of any due process rights.

B. 

Similarly, assuming that a lethal operation targeting a U.S. citizen abroad who is planning attacks against the United States would result in a "seizure" under the Fourth Amendment, such an operation would not violate that Amendment in the circumstances posited here. The Supreme Court has made clear that the constitutionality of a seizure is determined by "balanc[ing] the nature and quality of the intrusion on the individual's Fourth Amendment interests against the importance of the governmental interests alleged to justify the intrusion." Tennessee v. Garner, 471 US. 1, 8 (1985) (internal quotation marks omitted); accord Scott v. Harris, 550 U.S. 372, 383 (2007). Even in domestic law enforcement operations, the Court has noted that "[w]here the officer has probable cause to believe that the suspect poses a threat of serious physical harm, either to the officer or to others, it is not constitutionally unreasonable to prevent escape by using deadly force." Garner, 471 U.S. at 11. Thus, "if the suspect threatens the officer with a weapon or there is probable cause to believe that he has committed a crime involving the infliction or threatened infliction of serious physical harm, deadly force may be used if necessary to prevent escape, and if, where feasible, some warning has been given." Id. at 11-12.

The Fourth Amendment "reasonableness" test is situation-dependent. Cf. Scott, 550 U.S. at 382 ("Garner did not establish a magical on/off switch that triggers rigid preconditions whenever an officer's actions constitute 'deadly force.'"). What would constitute a reasonable use of lethal force for purposes of domestic law enforcement operations differs substantially from what would be reasonable in the situation and circumstances discussed in this white paper. But at least in circumstances where the targeted person is an operational leader of an enemy force and an informed, high-level government official has determined that he poses an imminent threat of violent attack, against the United States, and those conducting the operation would carry out the operation only if capture were infeasible, the use of lethal force would not violate the Fourth Amendment. Under such circumstances, the intrusion on any Fourth Amendment interests would be outweighed by the "importance of the governmental interests [that] justify the intrusion," Garner, 471 U.S. at 8—the interests in protecting the lives of Americans.

C. 

Finally, the Department notes that under the circumstances described in this paper, there exists no appropriate judicial forum to evaluate these constitutional consideration. It is well established that "[matters intimately related to foreign policy and national security are rarely proper subjects for judicial intervention," Haig v. Agee, 453 U.S. 280,292 (1981), because such matters "frequently turn on standards that defy judicial application," or "involve the exercise of a discretion demonstrably committed to the executive or legislature," Baker v. Can, 369 U.S. 186,211 (1962). Were a court to intervene here, it might be required inappropriately to issue an ex ante command to the President and officials responsible for operations with respect to their specific tactical judgment to mount a potential lethal operation against a senior operational leader of al-Qa'ida or its associated forces. And judicial enforcement of such orders would require the Court to supervise inherently predictive judgments by the President and his national security advisors as to when and how to use force against a member of an enemy force against which Congress has authorized the use of force.

III. 

Section 1119(b) of title 1 provides that a "person who, being a national of the United States, kills or attempts to kill a national of the United States while such national is outside the United States but within the jurisdiction of another country shall be punished as provided under sections 1111, 1112, and 1113." 18 U.S.C. § 1119(b) (2006). Because the person who would be the target of the kind of operation discussed here would be a U.S. citizen, it might be suggested that section 1119(b) would prohibit such an operation. Section 1119, however, incorporates the federal murder and manslaughter statutes, and thus its prohibition extends only to "unlawful killing[s]," 18 U.S.C. §§ 1111(a),  1112(a) (2006). Section 1119 is best construed to incorporate the "public authority" justification, which renders lethal action carried out by a government official lawful in some circumstances. As this paper explains below, a lethal operation of the kind discussed here would fall within the public authority exception under the circumstances and conditions posited because it would be conducted in a manner consistent with applicable law of war principles governing the non-intemational conflict between the United States and al-Qa'ida and its associated forces. It therefore would not result in an unlawful killing.

A. 

Although section 1119(b) refers only to the "punishments]" provided under sections 1111, 1112, and 1113, courts have held that section 1119(b) incorporates the substantive elements of those cross-referenced provisions of title 18. See, e.g., United States v. Wharton, 320 F.3d 526, 533 (5th Cir. 2003); United States v. White, 51 F. Supp. 2d 1008,1013-14 (E.D. Cal. 1997). Section 1111 of title 18 sets forth criminal penalties for "murder," and provides that "[m]urder is the unlawful killing of a human being with malice aforethought." 18 U.S.C. § 1111(a). Section 1112 similarly provides criminal sanctions for "[m]anslaughter," and states that "[mjanslaughter is the unlawful killing of a human being without malice:" Id.§ 112(a). Section 1113 provides criminal penalties for "attempts to commit murder or manslaughter." Id. § 1113. It is therefore clear that section 1119(b) bars only "unlawful killing."

Guidance as to the meaning of the phrase "unlawful killing" in sections 1111 and 1112—and thus for purposes of section 1119(b)—can be found in the historical understandings of murder and manslaughter. That history shows that states have long recognized justifications and excuses to statutes criminalizing "unlawful" killings. One state court, for example, in construing that state's murder statute, explained that "the word 'unlawful' is a term of art" that "connotes a homicide with the absence of factors of excuse or justification." People v. Frye, 10 Cal. Rptr. 2d 217,221 (Cal. Ct. App. 1992). That court further explained that the factors of excuse or justification in question include those that have traditionally been recognized. Id. at 221 n.2. Other authorities support the same conclusion. See, e.g., Mullaney v. Wilbur, 421 U.S. 684, 685 (1975) (requirement of "unlawful" killing in Maine murder statute meant that killing was "neither justifiable nor excusable"); cf. also Rollin M. Perkins & Ronald N. Boyce, Criminal Law 56 (3d ed. 1982) ("Innocent homicide is of two kinds, (1) justifiable and (2) excusable."). Accordingly, section 1119 does not proscribe killings covered by a justification traditionally recognized under the common law or state and federal murder statutes. "Congress did not intend [section 1119] to criminalize justifiable or excusable killings." White, 51 F. Supp. 2d at 1013.

B. 

The public authority justification is well-accepted, and it may be available even in cases where the particular criminal statute at issue does not expressly refer to a public authority justification. Prosecutions where such a "public authority" justification is invoked are understandably rare, see American Law Institute Model Penal Code and Commentaries § 3.03 Comment 1, at 23-24 (1985); cf. Visa Fraud Investigation, 8 Op. O.L.C. 284, 285 n.2, 286 (1984), and thus there is little case law in which courts have^ analyzed the scope of the justification with respect to the conduct of government officials. Nonetheless, discussions in the leading treatises and in the Model Penal Code demonstrate its legitimacy. See 2 Wayne R. LaFave, Substantive Criminal Law § 10.2(b), at 135 (2d ed. 2003); Perkins & Boyce, Criminal Law at 1093 ("Deeds which otherwise would be criminal, such as taking or destroying property, taking hold of a person by force and against his will, placing him in confinement, or even taking his life, are not crimes if done with proper public authority."); see also Model Penal Code § 3.03(l)(a), (d), (e), at 22-23 (proposing codification of justification where conduct is "required or authorized by," inter alia, "the law defining the duties or functions of a public officer," "the law governing the armed services or the lawful conduct of war," or "any other provision of law imposing a public duty"); National Commission on Reform of Federal Criminal Laws, A Proposed New Federal Criminal Code § 602(1) (1971) ("Conduct engaged in by a public servant in the course of his official duties is justified when it is required or authorized by law."). And the Department's Office of Legal Counsel ("OLC") has invoked analogous rationales when it has analyzed whether Congress intended a particular criminal statute to prohibit specific conduct that otherwise falls within a government agency's authorities. See, e.g., Visa Fraud Investigation, 8 Op. O.L.C. at 287-88 (concluding that a civil statute prohibiting issuance of visa to an alien known to be ineligible did not prohibit State Department from issuing such a visa where "necessary" to facilitate an important Immigration and Naturalization Service undercover operation carried out in a "reasonable" fashion).

The public authority justification would not excuse all conduct of public officials from all criminal prohibitions. The legislature may design some criminal prohibitions to place bounds on the kinds of governmental conduct that can be authorized by the Executive. Or the legislature may enact a criminal prohibition in order to limit the scope of the conduct that the legislature has otherwise authorized the Executive to undertake pursuant to another statute. See, e.g., Nardone v. United States, 302 U.S. 379, 384 (1937) (federal statute proscribed government wiretapping). But the generally recognized public authority justification reflects that it would not make sense to attribute to Congress the intent to criminalize all covered activities undertaken by public officials in the legitimate exercise of their otherwise lawful authorities, even if Congress clearly intends to make those same actions a crime when committed by persons not acting pursuant to public authority. In some instances, therefore, the best interpretation of a criminal prohibition is that Congress intended to distinguish persons who are acting pursuant to public authority from those Who are not, even if the statute does not make that distinction express. Cf. id. at 384 (federal criminal statutes should be construed to exclude authorized conduct of public officers where such a reading "would work obvious absurdity as, for example, the application of a speed law to a policeman pursuing a criminal or the driver of a fire engine responding to an alarm").

The touchstone for the analysis whether section 1119 incorporates not only justifications generally, but also the public authority justification in particular, is the legislative intent underlying this statute. Here, the statute should be read to exclude from its prohibitory scope killings that are encompassed by traditional justifications, which include the public authority justification. The statutory incorporation of two other criminal statutes expressly referencing "unlawful" killings is one indication. See supra at 10-11. Moreover, there are no indications that Congress had a contrary intention. Nothing in the text or legislative history of sections 1111-1113 of title 18 suggests that Congress intended to exclude the established public authority justification from those justifications that Congress otherwise must be understood to have imported through the use of the modifier "unlawful" in those statutes. Nor is there anything in the text or legislative history of section 1119 itself to suggest that Congress intended to abrogate or otherwise affect the availability of this traditional justification for killings. On the contrary, the relevant legislative materials indicate that, in enacting section 1119, Congress was merely closing a gap in a field dealing with entirely different kinds of conduct from that at issue here.

The Department thus concludes that section 1119 incorporates the public authority justification. This paper turns next to the question whether a lethal operation could be encompassed by that justification and, in particular, whether that justification would apply when the target is a U.S. citizen. The analysis here leads to the conclusion that it would.

C. 

A lethal operation against an enemy leader undertaken in national self-defense or during an armed conflict that is authorized by an informed, high-level official and carried out in a manner that accords with applicable law of war principles would fall within a well established variant of the public authority justification and therefore would not be murder. See, e.g., 2 Paul H. Robinson,[Criminal Law Defenses § 148(a), at 208 (1984) (conduct that would violate a criminal statute is justified and thus not unlawful "[where the exercise of military authority relies upon the law governing the armed forces or upon the conduct of war"); 2 LaFave, Substantive Criminal Law § 10.2(c) at 136 ("another aspect of the public duty defense is where the conduct was required or authorized by 'the law governing the armed services or the lawful conduct of war'"); Perkins & Boyce,
Criminal Law at 1093 (noting that a "typical instanceQ in which even the extreme act of taking human life is done by public authority" involves "the killing of an enemy as an act of war and within the rules of war").

The United States is currently in the midst of a congressionally authorized armed conflict with al-Qa'ida and associated forces, and may act in national self-defense to protect U.S. persons and interests who are under continual threat of violent attack by certain al-Q'aida operatives planning operations against them. The public authority justification would apply to a lethal operation of the kind discussed in this paper if it were conducted in accord with applicable law of war principles. As one legal commentator has explained, "if a soldier intentionally kills an enemy combatant in time of war and within the rules of warfare, he is not guilty of murder," whereas, for example, if that soldier intentionally kills a prisoner of war - a violation of the laws of war—"then he commits murder." 2 LaFave, Substantive Criminal Law § 10.2(c), at 136; see also State v. Gut, 13 Minn. 341, 357 (1868) ("That it is legal to kill an alien enemy in the heat and exercise of war, is undeniable; but to kill such an enemy after he has laid down his arms, and especially when he is confined in prison, is murder."); Perkins & Boyce, Criminal Law at 1093 ("Even in time of war an alien enemy may not be killed needlessly after he has been disarmed and securely imprisoned...."). Moreover, without invoking the public authority justification by its terms, this Department's OLC has relied on the same notion in an opinion addressing the intended scope of a federal criminal statute that concerned the use of potentially lethal force. See United States Assistance to Countries that Shoot Down Civil Aircraft Involved in Drug Trafficking, 18 Op. O.L.C. 148, 164 (1994) (concluding that the Aircraft Sabotage Act of 1984, 18 U.S.C. § 32(b)(2) (2006), which prohibits the willful destruction of a civil aircraft and otherwise applies to U.S. government conduct, should not be construed to have "the surprising and almost certainly unintended effect of criminalizing actions by military personnel that are lawful under international law and the laws of armed conflict").

The fact that an operation may target a U.S. citizen does not alter this conclusion. As explained above, see supra at 3, the Supreme Court has held that the military may constitutionally use force against a U.S. citizen who is part of enemy forces. See Hamdi, 542 U.S. at 518 (plurality opinion); id. at 587, 597 (Thomas, J. dissenting); Ex parte Quirin, 317 U.S. at 37-38 ("Citizens who associate themselves with the military arm of the enemy government, and with its aid, guidance and direction enter [the United States] bent on hostile acts," may be treated as "enemy belligerents" under the law of war.). Similarly, under the Constitution and the inherent right to national self-defense recognized in international law, the President may authorize the use of force against a U.S. citizen who is a member of al-Qa'ida or its associated forces and who poses an imminent threat of violent attack against the United States.

In light of these precedents, the Department believes that the use of lethal force addressed in this white paper would constitute a lawful killing under the public authority doctrine if conducted in a manner consistent with the fundamental law of war principles governing the use of force in a non-intemational armed conflict. Such an operation would not violate the assassination ban in Executive Order No. 12333. Section 2.11 of Executive Order No. 12333 provides that "[n]o person employed by or acting on behalf of the United States Government shall engage in, or conspire to engage in, assassination." 46 Fed. Reg. 59,941,59, 952 (Dec. 4,1981). A lawful killing in self-defense is not an assassination. In the Department's view, a lethal operation conducted against a U.S. citizen whose conduct poses an imminent threat of violent attack against the United States would be a legitimate act of national self-defense that would not violate the assassination ban. Similarly, the use of lethal force, consistent with the laws of war, against an individual who is a legitimate military target would be lawful and would not violate the assassination ban.

IV. 

The War Crimes Act, 18 U.S.C. § 2441 (2006) makes it a federal crime for a member of the Armed Forces or a national of the United States to "commit[] a war crime." Id. § 2441(a). The only potentially applicable provision of section 2441 to operations of the type discussed herein makes it a war crime to commit a "grave breach" of Common Article 3 of the Geneva Conventions when that breach is committed "in the context of and in association with an armed conflict not of an international character." Id. § 2441(c)(3). As defined by the statute, a "grave breach" of Common Article 3 includes "[m]urder," described in pertinent part as "[t]he act of a person who intentionally kills, or conspires or attempts to kill... one or more persons taking no active part in the hostilities, including those placed out of combat by sickness, wounds, detention, or any other cause." Id. § 2441(d)(1)(D).	

Whatever might be the outer bounds of this category of covered persons, Common Article 3 does not alter the fundamental law of war principle concerning a belligerent party's right in an armed conflict to target individuals who are part of an enemy's armed forces or eliminate a nation's authority to take legitimate action in national self-defense. The language of Common Article 3 "makes clear that members of such armed forces [of both the state and non-state parties to the conflict]... are considered as 'taking no active part in the hostilities' only once they have disengaged from their fighting function ('have laid down their arms') or are placed hors de combat; mere suspension of combat is insufficient." International Committee of the Red Cross, Interpretive Guidance on the Notion of Direct Participation in Hostilities Under International Humanitarian Law 28 (2009). An operation against a senior operational leader of al-Qa'ida or its associated forces who poses an imminent threat of violent attack against the United States would target a person who is taking "an active part in hostilities" and therefore would not constitute a "grave breach" of Common Article 3

V. 

In conclusion, it would be lawful for the United States to conduct a lethal operation outside the United States against a U.S. citizen who is a senior, operational leader of al-Qa'ida or an associated force of al-Qa'ida without violating the Constitution or the federal statutes discussed in this white paper under the following conditions: (1) an informed, high-level official of the U.S. government has determined that the targeted individual poses an imminent threat of violent attack against the United States; (2) capture is infeasible, and the United States continues to monitor whether capture becomes feasible; and (3) the operation is conducted in a manner consistent with the four fundamental principles of the laws of war governing the use of force. As stated earlier, this paper does not attempt to determine the minimum requirements necessary to render such an operation lawful, nor does it assess what might be required to render a lethal operation against a U.S. citizen lawful in other circumstances. It concludes only that the stated conditions would be sufficient to make lawful a lethal operation in a foreign country directed against a U.S. citizen with the characteristics described above.

References

United States Department of Justice publications